Merkel nerve endings are mechanoreceptors, a type of sensory receptor, that are found in the basal epidermis and hair follicles. They are nerve endings and provide information on mechanical pressure, position, and deep static touch features, such as shapes and edges.

Merkel cells in the basal epidermis of the skin store serotonin which they release to associated nerve endings in response to pressure. 
Each ending consists of a Merkel cell in close apposition with an enlarged nerve terminal. This is sometimes referred to as a Merkel cell–neurite complex, or a Merkel disc receptor. A single afferent nerve fibre branches to innervate up to 90 such endings.

Location
In mammals, Merkel nerve endings have a wide distribution and are found in the basal layer of glabrous and hairy skin, in hair follicles, and in oral and anal mucosa. Microscopically they are relatively large, myelinated nerve endings.

In humans, Merkel cells along with Meissner's corpuscles occur in the superficial skin layers, and are most densely clustered beneath the ridges of the highly sensitive fingertips which make up fingerprints, and less so in the palms and forearm. In hairy skin, Merkel nerve endings are clustered into specialized epithelial structures called "touch domes" or "hair disks". Merkel receptors are also located in the mammary glands. Wherever they are found, the epithelium is arranged to optimize the transfer of pressure to the ending.

Functions
Merkel cells provide information on pressure, position, and deep static touch features such as shapes and edges. They are tactile sensors in the business of mechanotransduction. They encode surface features of touched objects into perception, but also have to do with proprioception.
Merkel disks can also respond to light touch.
Merkel cells transduce tactile stimuli / mechanical forces into excitatory signals, which trigger vesicular serotonin release; they have also been called a "serotonergic synapse". They have similar functions as the enterochromaffin cell, the mechanosensory cell in the GI epithelium, which synthesizes 95% of the body's total serotonin or 5-HT. Like the cells responsible for the mechanotransduction in hearing, Merkel cells transduce mechanical forces into excitatory signals via ion conductance on mechanosensitive channels. of which Piezo2 is the Merkel cell's primary mechanosensor.

Electrophysiology
The Merkel cell's somewhat rigid structure, and the fact that they are not encapsulated, causes them to have a sustained response in the form of action potentials or spikes) to mechanical deflection of the tissue. Because of their sustained response to pressure, Merkel nerve endings are classified as slowly adapting in contrast to rapidly adapting receptors by Pacinian and Meissner's corpuscles, which respond only to the onset and offset of mechanical deflection.
In mammals, electrical recordings from single afferent nerve fibres have shown that the responses of Merkel nerve endings are characterized by a vigorous response to the onset of a mechanical ramp stimulus (dynamic), and then continued firing during the plateau phase (static). Firing during the static phase can continue for more than 30 minutes. The inter-spike intervals during sustained firing are irregular, in contrast to the highly regular pattern of inter-spike intervals obtained from slowly adapting type II mechanoreceptors.

They fire fastest, when small points indent the skin, and fire at a low rate on slow curves or flat surfaces. Convexities reduce their rate of firing further still.

Sensitivity and receptive fields
Merkel nerve endings are the most sensitive of the four main types of mechanoreceptors to vibrations at low frequencies, around 5 to 15 Hz.
Merkel nerve endings are extremely sensitive to tissue displacement, and may respond to displacements of less than 1 μm.
A mechanoreceptor's receptive field is the area within which a stimulus can excite the cell. If the skin is touched in two separate points within a single receptive field, the person will be unable to feel the two separate points. If the two points touched span more than a single receptive field then both will be felt. The size of mechanoreceptors' receptive fields in a given area determines the degree to which detailed stimuli can be resolved: the smaller and more densely clustered the receptive fields, the higher the resolution.

Type I afferent fibres have smaller receptive fields than type II fibres. Several studies indicate that type I fibres mediate high resolution tactile discrimination, and are responsible for the ability of our finger tips to feel fine detailed surface patterns (e.g. for reading Braille).
Merkel's discs have small receptive fields which allow for them to detect fine spatial separation. They also have two point discrimination.

Eponym
Merkel's discs are named after German anatomist Friedrich Merkel (1845–1919), who was 30 years old when he described them.

Diseases
In burns, Merkel endings are most commonly lost.

People who have diabetes, inflammatory diseases, or undergo chemotherapy can lose tactile sensitivity and develop tactile allodynia. Recreational drugs acting on serotoninergic synapses can cause exaggerated tactile sensations.

References

External links
 
 

Sensory receptors
Sensory systems